Roger Federer defeated Rafael Nadal in the final, 6–3, 6–4 to win the men's singles tennis title at the 2017 Miami Open. It was Federer's third Miami Open title, and he claimed his third Sunshine Double with the win. Federer saved two match points en route to the title, in the quarterfinals against Tomáš Berdych. It was Nadal's fifth runner-up finish without winning the title.

Novak Djokovic was the three-time reigning champion, but withdrew before the tournament due to a right elbow injury. Reigning world No. 1 Andy Murray also withdrew before the tournament due to a right elbow injury. This marked the first time since 1990, when the Masters tournaments were created, that neither the world No. 1 nor No. 2 played the Miami Open, and the first time since the 2005 Madrid Masters that neither Djokovic nor Murray featured in the main draw of a Masters event.

Stan Wawrinka was the first player other than a member of the Big Four to be the top seed at a Masters 1000 event since Andy Roddick at the 2005 Indian Wells Masters.

Seeds
All seeds receive a bye into the second round.

Draw

Finals

Top half

Section 1

Section 2

Section 3

Section 4

Bottom half

Section 5

Section 6

Section 7

Section 8

Qualifying

Seeds

Qualifiers

Lucky losers
 ''' Mikhail Youzhny

Qualifying draw

First qualifier

Second qualifier

Third qualifier

Fourth qualifier

Fifth qualifier

Sixth qualifier

Seventh qualifier

Eighth qualifier

Ninth qualifier

Tenth qualifier

Eleventh qualifier

Twelfth qualifier

References

External links
Main Draw
Qualifying Draw

Men's Singles
2017 Miami Open - Men's Singles